Machi is a Taiwanese hip hop group that has nine active members, with two additional members on a hiatus from group activities.

Members

Current 
 Jeff, Huang Li Cheng
 Stan, Huang Li Xing
 Jae Chong
 Andrew, Zhou Li Ming
 Nicky, Li Jiu Zhe
 Edward, Huang Li Quan
 Mel, Yang Yun He
 Luke, Cui Wei Kai
 Suffa, Fei Luu Feng
 Don P, Hong Jian Jun

Former or inactive 
 Steven, Lin Zhi Wen
 Kenny, Zhou Yi Ming
 Gabe, Lan Jun Tian

Founders 
 Bobby Sheng
 Jae Chong
 Jeffery Huang

International collaborations 
MACHI collaborated with well-known hip-hop artist Missy Elliott after meeting in New York. Missy Elliott was impressed by Taiwanese rap and remixed her well-known song "Work It" with Machi's Jump 2003; resulting in the debut crossover Work it, Jump 2003. Producer Floss P, from Dr. Dre's Aftermath music label, also produced a track "You Can't Do It" for MACHI on their second album 2nd Opus in July 2004. MACHI then looked around Asia and teamed up with Asia's top Turntablist DJ TOMMY from Hong Kong on their third album Superman.

MACHI Entertainment 
MACHI Entertainment is one of the largest Asian hip hop/rap record labels. It was founded in Taiwan by super music producer Jae Chong and business partners Jeffrey Huang and Bobby Sheng. The label is independent of Warner Music Taiwan. As a member of the group SOLID, Jae Chong sold millions of records in Korea and later became one of the most prolific music producers in Asia with more than 50 million albums sold all over the world.  He partnered with Jeffrey Huang and Bobby Sheng who founded TheOne Technology Group back when they were still based in Los Angeles. TheOne Technology Group specialized in bridging the cultural and language barriers for Internet-based projects. Together, they acquired a stellar clientele list including IBM, Nike and Hewlett Packard. In 2000 they orchestrated a $60,000,000, three-company merger that combined TheOne Technology group and Dynalab with DynaComware. Together, they re-structured the company in Japan and has positioned it for an IPO on the Japan Stock Exchange in 2005.

Their new venture, MACHI Entertainment is their respond to the emerging entertainment sector and the demand for urban music in the entertainment industry in Asia. In 2001, they founded Machi Entertainment Group, the leading music and television production company for the "Urban" genre in Taiwan. Machi established itself as the leader in Music production in Asia with leading talents such as Jeffrey Huang, Jay Chou, Missy Elliott, A-mei, Stanley Huang, Jolin Tsai, Vanness Wu, Elva Hsiao, Coco Lee, Brandy, Nicky Lee, Melody Yeung, and solid partnerships with Warner Music Group, Virgin EMI, and Sony. Machi Entertainment's investment in foreign distribution and television production has also established Machi as a young and innovative entertainment

Libel suit 
Group founder Jeff Huang was sued by a R.O.C. legislators for libel. The rap song "Retribution" released in 2005 implied possible death for corrupt legislators who may have passed laws to possibly make it easier to illegally copy and distribute music in Taiwan. The Taipei District Court found him innocent on 11 May 2007, citing no "intention of malice".

Discography

See also 
 L.A. Boyz

External links 

 Warner Music TW
 Warner Music TW Machi Profile
 Song on the Nanjing massacre

References 

Taiwanese hip hop groups
Taiwanese Hokkien-language bands